This is a listing of the horses that finished in either first, second, or third place and the number of starters in the James W. Murphy Stakes, an American stakes race for three-year-olds at one mile on the turf held at Pimlico Race Course in Baltimore, Maryland.

A  # indicates that the race was run in two divisions. The years in which two divisions were run include: 1986, 1985, 1981, 1975, 1974, 1973, 1971, 1969 and 1968.

References 

Flat horse races for three-year-olds
Turf races in the United States
Listed stakes races in the United States
Sports competitions in Baltimore
Pimlico Race Course
Horse races in Maryland